Ambrugeat is a commune in the Corrèze department in the Nouvelle-Aquitaine region of central France.

The inhabitants of the commune are known as Ambrugeacois or Ambrugeacoises

Geography

Ambrugeat is located some 80 km south-east of Limoges and immediately to the west of Meymac. It can be accessed by the D76 road from Meymac which continues through the village then south-west to join the D16 north of Égletons. There is also the D123 minor road running north off the D76 passing through the western part of the commune. The D76E also runs off the D76 to the south-east to join the D36 road. The commune is largely forested with some farmland.

The village lies on the north-western shore of the Lac de Sechemaille whose shores form the eastern border at this point. Several streams rise in the commune and flow into the lake such as the Ruisseau de la Nauche, the Ruisseau de Laubard, and the Ruisseau des Farges. Other streams flow south through the western part of the commune to form the Ruisseau de Sautere.

Neighbouring communes and villages

History
1308: The Bishop of Saint Leonard de Noblat put an end to quarrels between the two Ambrugeat priests.
1370: the entire Barsanges land was attached to the parish of Ambrugeat.
1436: Pierre de Coux was pastor prior for Ambrugeat.
1453: King Charles VII heightened Ambrugeat castle.
1502: Hugues de Beynette founded a vicarage at the altar of the Virgin and a community of fifteen priests were moved to Beynat in Ambrugeat.
1554: François Granier was prior of Ambrugeat.
1558: a survey of the commune was carried out.
1592: King Henry IV was supported by the lord of Ambrugeat.
1598: research was done on the titles of the nobility of Ambrugeat.
1599: Murat Antoine was Curé of Ambrugeat
1647: Gilbert du Boucheron sells the rental property rights for the high, low, and middle for the village of Besse in Ambrugeat.

Heraldry

Administration

List of Successive Mayors

Demography
In 2017 the commune had 205 inhabitants.

Culture and heritage

Civil heritage
The commune has a number of buildings and structures that are registered as historical monuments:
A Farmhouse (1) at Laubard (1802)
A Farmhouse (2) at Laubard (1811)
A Bread Oven at Laubard (19th century)
A Bread Oven at Lassagne (19th century)
A Farmhouse at Lafond (1663). The Farmhouse contains a pair of Andirons with hobs (19th century) which are registered as an historical object.
A Farmhouse at Besse (1662)
The Chateau of Ambrugeat (16th century) is at the entrance to the town. It was built as a fortified farm in 1448 by Charles VII.
Mills (18th-19th century)
Farmhouses (17th-20th century)

Other sites of interest
A very old Stone Trough attached to the Chassagnac house at Beynat. Marius Vazeilles, a local scholar, said that the washing-trough is very old.
In the same village, there are two other notable troughs. The second is located in the bread oven, a very old construction in the Madesclaire-Aumarchad house. The third is on the terrace of the Cheze Sailly Chassagnac families' house. This trough, in granite, has a diameter of 0.90 m and a height of 0.95 m round and is entirely hand carved. It is clearly a very old piece of undeniable archaeological value.

Religious heritage
The commune has several religious buildings and structures that are registered as historical monuments:
The Calvary of Besse (1623)
A Monumental Cross at Laubard (17th century)
A Monumental Cross at Lassagne (20th century)
A Monumental Cross at Besse (1623)
A Monumental Cross (1899)
A Presbytery (19th century)
The Parish Church of Saint Salvy and Saint Martin (13th century)  with its triangular gabled bell tower and three arched bays from the 16th century is at the centre of the village. Inside the church behind the altar is a large altarpiece from the 18th century.
Monumental Crosses (17th-20th century)

The Parish Church contains many items that are registered as historical objects:

The Furniture in the Church
2 Bronze Bells (1784)
A Commemorative plaque: obituary of Gilbert du Boucheron (1660)
2 Decorative Vases (19th century)
A Processional Banner (19th century)
An Ex-voto of the House of Lorette (19th century)
A Reliquary-Monstrance of Saint Vincent de Paul (1865)
A Sunburst Monstrance (19th century)
A Ciborium (1819-1838)
3 Patens (19th century)
2 Chalices (1819-1838)
A Statue: Saint Salvy (19th century)
A Statue: Saint Salvy (15th century)
A Statue: Virgin and child (19th century)
A Statuette: Saint Theresa of Lisieux (20th century)
A Sacristy Cross: Christ on the Cross (19th century)
2 Statues: Saint Martin and Saint Salvy (18th century)
A Baptismal font enclosure (18th century)
The Saint Salvy Altar, Altar seating, Tabernacle, and Retable (17th century)
The Virgin Altar, Altar seating, Tabernacle, and Retable (17th century)
The main Altar, Altar seating, Tabernacle, Retable, and Altar paintings (17th century)
A Capital (13th century)

Picture Gallery

Notable people linked to the commune
Martial Brigouleix, a resistance fighter born on 24 April 1903 at Ambrugeat and shot on 2 October 1943 at Mont-Valerien
André Desassis (known as "Darius"), a resistance fighter born in 1920 in the village of Lassagne and died in April 1944 after an unpleasant imprisonment at Limoges. He set up contact with Georges Guingouin as a basis for the first FTP (Francs-tireurs et partisans) troops. A monument was erected to his memory on the town square in Ambrugeat and a ceremony is held every Easter Monday to recall his commitment: in particular the National Association of Veterans of the Resistance (ANACR) and the mayor of the commune.
Bernard Mazaud, painter and former resistance fighter

See also
Communes of the Corrèze department

References

External links
Ambrugeat on the old National Geographic Institute website 
Ambrugeat on Géoportail, National Geographic Institute (IGN) website 
Ambrugeas on the 1750 Cassini Map

Communes of Corrèze